Dàna, which means "bold" or "imprudent" in Scottish Gaelic, is an independent online magazine written entirely in Scottish Gaelic, founded in 2014. It is run by a team of volunteers, accepts article submissions via e-mail, and publishes articles frequently. The magazine describes its intent as follows: 
 cha robh iris Ghàidhlig sam bith ann, mar sin bha sinn airson a bhith a’ lìonadh beàrn le rudeigin snasail ’s spòrsail
 bha sinn airson a’ Ghàidhlig àbhaisteachadh, gu h-àraidh air-loidhne
 bha sinn airson cothroman cleachdaidh a chruthachadh a thaobh na Gàidhlig san fharsaingeachd
 bha sinn airson leughadh agus sgrìobhadh na Gàidhlig a bhrosnachadh gu sònraichte
Translation:
 there wasn't any Gaelic magazine at all, so we endeavor to fill the lack thereof with fun and articulate content
 we wanted to normalize Gaelic, especially online
 we wanted opportunities for readers to appreciate Gaelic in general
 in particular, we wanted to read and write in Gaelic to raise its status

History
Dàna started to publish in 2013 after the news that Cothrom, the Gaelic magazine for learners by Clì, would be coming to an end (it has since gone to a digital form). Dàna was the first Gaelic e-zine. Conscious of the disruption caused by the sudden closure of earlier Scottish Gaelic periodicals, including Cothrom and the literary magazines Gairm and Gath due to cessation of grants, Dàna elected to remain independent of external funding decisions. As a result, the editors and contributors are all volunteers.

Content
A variety of articles are published digitally, including news, politics, technology, Gaelic-interest, general interest, literature and other.

The magazine, which avoids the use of English wherever possible, has called attention to the abundance of English on purportedly Gaelic-language media, especially BBC Alba, and what they consider excessive attempts to make the media accessible to English speakers at the expense of Gaelic speakers.

See also
List of newspapers in Scotland

References

Newspapers published in Scotland
Newspapers with Scottish Gaelic content
2014 establishments in Scotland